is a series of ten two-minute shorts that were sponsored by Yahoo! as a free promotion for Yahoo! Japan. The episodes were broadcast in 2004 and most shorts were directed by a different Studio 4°C director. Plotlines were all developed by science fiction writer Shinichi Hoshi—renowned for having created more than a thousand shorts and known in Japan as the "God of Short Shorts". Because Hoshi was famous for being protective of the integrity of his works during his lifetime, the idea of releasing the series as a webcast was only proposed after Hoshi had died in the late 1990s.

All ten episodes are characterized by a futuristic science-fiction setting in which an eccentric scientist with a genius for invention works to create a host of robots, each designed to help humans in a different but very particular and often counter intuitive manner. As the robots interact with their human masters and their surroundings in pre-programmed ways unanticipated problems arise and provide for a variety of comedic situations.

Episodes

Voice cast
Megumi Matsumoto - The Doctor's Assistant and all other female characters
Toshiyuki Itakura - The Doctor and all other male voices

Reception
Reception for the series has been positive in Japan and in the West. AnimeNation's John Oppliger described Kimagure Robot as an "artistic and esoteric anime" and decried the lack of awareness of complex and avant-garde titles like this in American anime consumers.

References

External links
 Official Kimagure Robot website
 

2004 anime OVAs
Studio 4°C